In molecular biology, Small nucleolar RNA SNORA63 (E3) belongs to the H/ACA class of snoRNAs, is involved in the processing of eukaryotic pre-rRNA and has regions of complementarity to 18S rRNA. E3 is encoded in introns in the gene for protein synthesis initiation factor 4AII.

References

External links 
 

Small nuclear RNA